Platelet storage pool deficiency is a type of coagulopathy characterized by defects in the granules in platelets, particularly a lack of granular non-metabolic adenosine diphosphate. Individuals with adenosine diphosphate deficient storage pool disease present a prolonged bleeding time due to impaired aggregation response to fibrillar collagen.

Symptoms and signs

The presentation (signs/symptoms) of an individual with  platelet storage pool deficiency is as follows:
Unusual bleeding(after surgical procedure)
Anemia
Decrease mean platelet volume
Myelodysplasia

Cause

The condition of platelet storage pool deficiency can be acquired  or inherited (genetically passed on from the individuals parents). Some of the causes of platelet storage pool deficiency when acquired are:
Hairy-cell leukemia
Cardiovascular bypass

Mechanism

In terms of the pathophysiology of platelet storage pool deficiency one must consider several factors including the human body's normal function prior to such a deficiency, such as platelet alpha-granules one of three types of platelet secretory granule

Platelet α–granules are important in platelet activity, α–granules connect with plasma membrane. This in turn increases the size of the platelet. Platelet α–granules have an important role in hemostasis as well as thrombosis. SNARE accessory proteins control the secretion of α–granule.

Diagnosis

The diagnosis of this condition can be done via the following:
 Flow cytometry
 Bleeding time analysis
 Platelet aggregation function study:

Types
This condition may involve the alpha granules or the dense granules.
Therefore, the following examples include:

 Platelet alpha-granules
 Gray platelet syndrome
 Quebec platelet disorder
 Dense granules
 δ-Storage pool deficiency
 Hermansky–Pudlak syndrome
 Chédiak–Higashi syndrome

Treatment
Platelet storage pool deficiency has no treatment however management consists of antifibrinolytic medications if the individual has unusual bleeding event, additionally caution should be taken with usage of NSAIDS

See also
 Hypocoagulability
 Hypercoagulability

References

Further reading

External links 
 PubMed

Coagulopathies